are a subcategory of cosplay restaurants found predominantly in Japan. In these cafés, waitresses, dressed in maid costumes, act as servants, and treat customers as masters (and mistresses) as in a private home, rather than as café patrons. The first permanent maid café, Cure Maid Café, was established in Akihabara, Tokyo, Japan, in March 2001, but maid cafés are becoming increasingly popular. As they have done so, the increased competition has made use of some unusual tactics in order to attract customers. They have also expanded overseas to several countries around the world.

History 
Maid cafés were traditionally associated with Akihabara (秋葉原), a district in Tokyo famous for its extensive electronics and anime/manga related stores. Commonly a place for otaku to visit, Akihabara contains several themed cafes, including maid cafes. However, with the increasing media attention on these cafes, they have developed into tourist attractions as well and less of an otaku hotspot. Because of this, peak wait times can be about two hours. These establishments also tap into a new trend in Japan that deals with alternate forms of intimacy. Historically, following Japan’s economic crash during the 1990s, the ideas surrounding intimacy changed to become more individualistic. Because of this, some people who cannot form organic relationships with others turn to other forms of intimacy in order to fulfill the missing intimacy in their lives. Therefore, maid cafes provide a place for people to do so, especially for those who are interested in manga and anime because these cafes tend to mimic these works. In addition, though maid cafes can have certain connotations, these establishments do not provide any sexual services.

Comparison to other establishments 
Though maid cafes do not provide sexual services, the gender relations contribute to the popularity and enjoyable experience for patrons. Scholars such as Patrick Galbraith and Anne Allison conclude that maid cafes provide a very different experience compared to things such as hostess clubs. These places focus more on the workplace and satisfying men due to their hard work, whereas maid cafes operate in quite different ways. For example, visiting maid cafes often is not seen as anything shameful, whereas chronically visiting a hostess bar is viewed quite differently in Japan. In fact, many maid cafes rely on regular customers to provide stable business. Instead, maid cafes focus on providing an escape from the home and work spheres. Furthermore, according to anthropologists such as Anne Allison, a maid cafe lacks the same sexual and caretaker undertones that hostess bars do. Maids encapsulate a more pure form that provides an alternate world to patrons. Customers tend to not stray from appropriate topics as an attempt to preserve this space created through role play with the maid.

Employees 
These maids are almost always younger women, ranging from around 18 years old to their mid twenties. These women make roughly around the Japanese minimum wage and tend to live with their families. The maids themselves tend to enjoy anime and manga and other aspects of otaku culture, allowing them to create further connections with their patrons. However, these jobs tend to not be careers for these women, rather being stopgaps before acquiring permanent employment elsewhere. Contrary to popular belief, the maids themselves tend to enjoy their work due to the ability to express themselves and explore the cafe's alternate character universe alongside the patrons. However, issues still remain regarding patron conduct outside the workplace. Although strict rules are established to prevent disorderly conduct at these cafes, some customers violate these rules and attempt to make contact outside the workplace, causing maids to experience discomfort.  Preserving a particular image/identity is also vital to upholding the fantasy component of these establishments. In addition to the strict rules for patrons, the maids adopt different names for work and are not allowed to smoke or drink. Their personal relationships with men are also affected, as they cannot spend time with other Akihabara men. By doing so, this allows the maids to uphold a specific identity to their patrons and potential customers. When their careers as maids come to a close, whether due to age or by choice, some can opt to work for the corporate agencies behind these cafes. For example, one prominent maid from @home cafe opted to work on the advertising side of the industry after entering the dating scene and therefore altering her identity as a maid.

Costume and appearance 

The maid costume varies from café to café but most are based upon the costume of French maids, often composed of a dress, a petticoat, a pinafore, a matching hair accessory (such as a frill or a bow), and stockings. Often, employees will also cosplay as anime characters. Sometimes, employees wear animal ears with their outfits to add more appeal. Most commonly, manga style costumes are worn.

Waitresses in maid cafés are often chosen on the basis of their appearance; most are young, attractive and innocent-looking women. Applicants are sometimes tested to determine whether they can sufficiently portray a given character that they will be cosplaying. In order to maintain the cosplay fantasy, some employees may be contractually obligated to not reveal personal information to patrons, to slip out of character or to allow patrons to see them out of costume.

These maids are traditionally female, with men working in operational tasks such as cooking.  However, some maid cafés also have cross-dressing males as maids. Because they're men dressed up as maids instead of women, crossdressing maid cafés have attracted a lot of attention and become very popular.

Clientele 

Maid cafés were originally designed primarily to cater to the fantasies of male otaku – fans of anime, manga and video games. They have been analogized as the otaku's equivalent of hostess bars. The image of the maid is one that has been popularized and fetishized in many manga and anime series, as well as in gal games. Important to the otaku attraction to maid cafés is the Japanese concept of moe. People who have moe fetishes (especially a specific subcategory known as maid moe) are therefore attracted to an establishment in which they can interact with real-life manifestations (both physically and in demeanor) of the fictional maid characters that they have fetishized. Cafés may also employ a tsundere theme - another character trope which is a subset of the moe phenomenon and refers to a character who is initially cold or hostile before revealing feelings of warmth or affection.

Around the early 2000s, maid cafés became more common and popular in Japan as otaku culture became increasingly mainstream. As a result, there has been a diversification of themes and services at the restaurants but they are ultimately still predominantly colored by anime and video games. Today, the maid café phenomenon attracts more than just male otaku, but also couples, tourists, and women.

Other types of cafés consist of:

 Victorian style, based on the Victorian era of the U.K.
 "Modern-traditional", where maids wear a mixture of kimono and maid outfits.
 Neko Café: Neko (ネコ, 猫) means cat in Japanese, and maids will wear cat tails and cat ears.

Menu 

Most maid cafés offer menus similar to those of more typical cafés. Customers can order coffee, other beverages, and a wide variety of entrées and desserts. However, in maid cafés, waitresses will often decorate a customer's order with cute designs at his or her table. This service adds to the image of the waitress as an innocent but pampering maid. These prices are typically raised in order to compensate for the service provided by these maids.

In the making of these decorative desserts and entrées, maids will often also begin to say chants, making both the experience and food that their customers are about to receive seem more .

Rituals, etiquette and additional services 

There are many rituals and additional services offered at many maid cafés. Maids will also kneel by the table to stir cream and sugar into a customer's coffee, and some cafés even offer spoon-feeding services to customers. Customers can also sometimes play rock-paper-scissors, card games, board games and video games with maids as well as prepare arts and crafts and sing karaoke. 

Many Maid cafes have a small stage. Where the maids will perform and also take pictures with the customers. 

Customers are also expected to follow basic rules when they are at a maid café. One Tokyo maid café recently published a list of ten rules that customers should follow in a maid café. For example, customers should not touch a maid's body, ask for a maid's personal contact information, or otherwise invade her personal privacy (by stalking). One common rule in a maid café is that photographs of maids or the café interior are forbidden. However, customers may have the option of paying an extra fee to have their photograph taken with a maid, possibly hand-decorated by the maid. Some maid cafes implement an hourly charge. Patrons are further reminded of these rules when entering, as posters are often on the wall listing rules for that particular establishment.

See also 

 Akihabara Trilogy (films inspired by maid cafés)
 Band-Maid (a female Japanese rock band with a maid café theme)
 Butler café
 Cigarette girl
 Hostess club
 Maid Sama!

References

Further reading 

 Hoffman, Ken. "A haircut and more at Maid Café". Houston Chronicle. December 5, 2011.

External links 

Types of coffeehouses and cafés
Cosplay
Heisei period
Japanese inventions
Japanese popular culture
2001 introductions